In computer software, strings is a program in Unix, Plan 9, Inferno, and Unix-like operating systems that finds and prints text strings embedded in binary files such as executables. It can be used on object files and core dumps.

Overview
Strings are recognized by looking for sequences of at least 4 (by default) printable characters terminating in a NUL character (that is, null-terminated strings). Some implementations provide options for determining what is recognized as a printable character, which is useful for finding non-ASCII and wide character text.

It is part of the GNU Binary Utilities, and has been ported to other operating systems including Windows.

Example
Using strings to print sequences of characters that are at least 8 characters long (this command prints the system's BIOS information; should be run as root):
dd if=/dev/mem bs=1k skip=768 count=256 2>/dev/null | strings -n 8 | less

See also

 Cat (Unix)
 Paste (Unix)
 GNU Debugger
 Strip (Unix)

References

External links

 
 
 

Unix text processing utilities
Unix SUS2008 utilities
Plan 9 commands
Inferno (operating system) commands
String (computer science)